Fitzhugh Lee (1835–1905) was the 40th Governor of Virginia and United States Army general. Fitzhugh Lee or Fitz Lee may also refer to
Fitzhugh Lee III (1905–1992), Vice Admiral in the United States Navy, grandson of Fitzhugh Lee
Fitz Lee (Medal of Honor) (1866–1899), United States Army soldier 
William Henry Fitzhugh Lee (1837–1891), General in the American Civil War and Congressman from Virginia
Harry Fitzhugh Lee, American businessman
Harry Fitzhugh Lee House in North Carolina, U.S.
Lee Mason Fitzhugh (1877–1937), co-founder of the Fitzhugh & Byron architectural partnership in Phoenix, Arizona, U.S.